Live at the Royal Albert Hall is the fourteenth album by the American jazz fusion band Snarky Puppy and the group's first live, in-concert album for general release. (Several previous Snarky Puppy albums had been recorded with an audience present, but those were done with a small audience seated around a studio-like setting.) It was recorded on November 14, 2019, and released on March 6, 2020. The album was released in sets of 2 CDs, 3 LPs, or 2 CDs and 3 LPs. The release won a Grammy Award for the Best Contemporary Instrumental Album at the 63rd Annual Grammy Awards.

Track listing

Personnel
From Live at the Royal Albert Hall liner notes: 

 Mark Lettieri – guitar
 Zach Brock – violin
 Bobby Sparks – keyboards
 Bill Laurance – keyboards
 Shaun Martin – keyboards
 Justin Stanton – keyboards, trumpet
 Mike "Maz" Maher – trumpet, flugelhorn
 Chris Bullock – tenor saxophone, flute, alto flute 
 Bob Reynolds – tenor saxophone
 Jason "JT" Thomas – drums
 Keito Ogawa – percussion
 Marcelo Woloski – percussion
 Mason Davis – krakebs on "Xavi"
 Michael League – bass guitar, Moog bass, and krakebs

References

2020 live albums
Grammy Award for Best Contemporary Instrumental Album
GroundUPmusic albums
Snarky Puppy albums